Henry Goldsmith Vigne (1817 – 20 June 1898), born Henry Goldsmith, was an English cricketer and clergyman.

He was born in London and educated at Peterhouse, Cambridge, being admitted in 1834, graduating B.A. 1838, M.A. 1844. He was ordained deacon in 1840 and priest in 1841.

Born Henry Goldsmith, he adopted the name Vigne in 1844, on the death of his uncle, Frederick Vigne.

A batsman for the Marylebone Cricket Club across four first-class games between 1837 and 1838, Vigne spent the rest of his playing career in club cricket for St John's Wood and Wanstead.

He was Vicar of Sunbury-on-Thames in Middlesex from 1842 to 1898.

On 21 November 1842 he married Anne Hodgson, daughter of Christopher Hodgson. She died on 11 September 1873.

Vigne died at the vicarage in Sunbury-on-Thames on 20 June 1898, and was buried in Sunbury Old Cemetery.

References

 
 

1817 births
1898 deaths
Alumni of Peterhouse, Cambridge
English cricketers of 1826 to 1863
Marylebone Cricket Club cricketers
19th-century English Anglican priests